Alice Kertész (also Alíz Kertész; born November 17, 1935) is a former Hungarian gymnast.

She is Jewish, and was born in Budapest, Hungary. She helped Hungary win the silver medal in the team event in gymnastics at the 1954 World Artistic Gymnastics Championships.

She won a gold medal in team exercise with portable apparatus and a silver medal in team combined exercises at the 1956 Olympics in Melbourne.  She placed 6th in the uneven bars.

The Hungarian Gymnastic Federation awarded her and her fellow Olympic team members the Hungarian President's Medal in June 2011.

See also
 List of select Jewish gymnasts

References

External links
 
 

1935 births
Living people
Hungarian female artistic gymnasts
Jewish gymnasts
Olympic gymnasts of Hungary
Olympic gold medalists for Hungary
Olympic silver medalists for Hungary
Gymnasts at the 1956 Summer Olympics
Olympic medalists in gymnastics
Hungarian Jews
Medalists at the 1956 Summer Olympics
Medalists at the World Artistic Gymnastics Championships
Gymnasts from Budapest